was a Japanese samurai, swordsman, marksman, firearm inventor, gunsmith, soldier, and military officer.

Biography
Murata joined the revolutionary Imperial Japanese Army at the outbreak of the Boshin War. Engagements in which Murata was involved included the battles of Toba–Fushimi, Bonari Pass, and Aizu.

In 1875, he was sent to Europe to study modern firearms technology and gunnery techniques. During his tour, he was received by, among others, France, Germany, Holland and Sweden–Norway. However, local authorities blocked him from visiting any formal facilities due to a prevailing fear of arms development in Asia. Despite the obstruction, he was somehow able to acquire at least one Gras rifle and Beaumont rifle respectively and studied their mechanical and ergonomic designs. In 1880, he developed Japan's first indigenously produced standardized service rifle, the Murata rifle. Around that time, Murata built a summer house in Ōiso, Kanagawa Prefecture.

At the Koishikawa arsenal in the early 1880s, Murata oversaw the manufacturing of the first batches of Murata rifles to be distributed to the Japanese armed forces. Many units were personally inspected by him, and early production models were engraved with his signature.

Murata's research on firearm design was taken over by his student Arisaka Nariakira. Murata remained in reserve throughout the First Sino-Japanese and Russo-Japanese Wars, but did not play an active role.

Privately, Murata was an avid practitioner of precision target shooting. In his later years, he often travelled to Europe to participate in long range shooting competitions where he won a number of championships.

He died of liver failure in 1921 at the age of 83. Murata's grave is located at Yanaka Cemetery in Taitō, Tokyo.

References 

1838 births
1921 deaths
Samurai
People of the Boshin War
Meiji Restoration
Military snipers
People from Kagoshima Prefecture
Japanese inventors
Gunsmiths
Japanese soldiers
Deaths from liver failure
Military personnel from Kagoshima Prefecture